The 1977–78 Montana Grizzlies basketball team represented the University of Montana during the 1977–78 NCAA Division I basketball season. Charter members of the Big Sky Conference, the Grizzlies were led by second-year head coach Jim Brandenburg and played their home games on campus at Adams Field House in Missoula, Montana.

They finished the regular season at 19–7, with a  record in conference to win the title and host the four-team Big Sky tournament. The Grizzlies defeated fourth-seed Boise State in the  then were upset by third-seed Weber State in the final  Montana had swept the season series with Weber.

The Grizzlies were led on the court by senior guard Micheal Ray Richardson, on the all-conference team for a third consecutive year; junior forward Allan Nielsen was on the second team. An honorable mention All-American, Richardson was the fourth overall selection of the 1978 NBA draft and a four-time NBA All-Star.

Postseason results

|-
!colspan=6 style=| Big Sky tournament

References

External links
Sports Reference – Montana Grizzlies: 1977–78 basketball season

Montana Grizzlies basketball seasons
Montana
Montana Grizzlies basketball
Montana Grizzlies basketball